Justin DuPratt White (1869–1939) was an American attorney best known for co-founding the White & Case law firm. In 1939 he was chairman of the Cornell University Board of Trustees.

Early life and education
White was born in Middletown, NY in 1869. He was the third of four children born to Charles White, a merchant, and Elizabeth White.

White graduated from Nyack High School in 1885 among the first class of students to be awarded state diplomas. He earned a scholarship to Cornell University, where he was editor of the Cornell Daily Sun and was a member of the Alpha Tau Omega fraternity. He graduated in 1890.and was admitted to the New York State Bar in 1892.

White & Case LLP 
In 1902, White and George B. Case founded the law firm White & Case, which served prominent corporate clients such as Bankers Trust Company, as well as Cornell University.

Honors and awards 
In 1919, White received a chevalier of the Legion of Honor by the French Foreign Legion. Colgate University awarded White an LLD degree in 1936. He was names as a commission of the Palisades Interstate Park in 1900. He served as president of the Palisades Interstate Park Commission from 1925 until 1939.

Involvement with Cornell University 
On May 5, 1928, the Cornell University Board of Trustees elected White as a trustee to fill a vacancy, and he continued to serve until his death.  While on the board, White served on the Buildings and Grounds Committee, Law School Committee, and Medical School Committee.  He was elected chairman of the board of trustees in 1939, but because of his untimely death, had the shortest tenure as chairman in the university's history.

In his will, which was 30 pages long, White stipulated that any funds from his multi-million dollar beyond the first eight beneficiaries go to Cornell University.

Legacy
White & Case endowed the J. DuPratt White Professor of Law in his honor.

References

External links
 Guide to the J. DuPratt White Papers

Cornell Law School alumni
1869 births
1939 deaths
New York (state) lawyers